Orobanche hederae, the ivy broomrape, is, like other members of the genus Orobanche, a parasitic plant without chlorophyll, and thus totally dependent on its host, which is ivy.

Etymology
Orobanche is derived from Greek, and means 'bitter vetch strangler'. This name originates from the species Orobanche rapum-genistae, which parasitizes legumes. The name hederae means 'of ivy', in reference to its host plant, Hedera.

Common names in English include ivy broomrape and chokeweed. It is also called erva-toira da hera in Portuguese and orobanche du lierre in French.

Description
They are covered in short soft glandular hairs. Leaves are acute and oblong to lance-shaped. They are almost hairless and upright spreading to more or less patent. They are usually hairless but rarely somewhat hairy below. Fruit are  capsules.

In Mediterranean climates it flowers from late April to mid July.

Distribution
Its native distribution matches that of its host, ivy, so it is mainly found in central and Northern Europe.

In the US, the only place it's been observed is in a patch of ivy at the University of California, Berkeley. It's speculated that a botany student purposely planted it there since ivy is very invasive in California.

Phylogeny
O. hederae is usually included in the "Orobanche" section of genus Orobanche. Phylogenetic studies suggest the amethyst broomrape (O. amethystea) is its closest relative. O. amethystea primarily parasitizes field eryngo (Eryngium campestre) which is in the order Apiales.

Uses
The Greek physician Dioscorides wrote that the plant, called Οροβαχνη, can be eaten raw or cooked like asparagus and also stated that cooking the plant with pulses makes the pulses cook faster. While Dioscorides doesn't include medicinal information in his description, Russian and Northern folklore both describe the plant as highly medicinal.

Gallery

References

hederae
Flora of Europe
Plants described in 1828